Novobavarskyi District, formerly known as Zhovtnevy District, is an urban district of the city of Kharkiv, Ukraine, named after a neighborhood in the city Nova Bavaria.

The district was established in 1924. In 2016 it was renamed to its current name to comply with decommunization laws.

References

Urban districts of Kharkiv